Sanco, Texas is a near-abandoned unincorporated community in Coke County, Texas, 16 miles northwest of Robert Lee east of Highway 208 on an unnamed county road. In 1990, the population was a mere 30 people.

References

Unincorporated communities in Texas
Unincorporated communities in Coke County, Texas
Ghost towns in West Texas